Kim So-jung is the name of:

 Kim So-jung (tennis) (born 1986), South Korean tennis player
 Kim So-jung (singer) (born 1989), South Korean singer